Michael Foster (born December 9, 1964) is an American musician and the drummer of rock band FireHouse.

Biography
Foster was born in Richmond, Virginia to James Ernest and Patricia (née Valenti) Foster. He has a younger brother called Daniel Sean. When he was 5 years old, his mother gave him his first real drum set and he dedicated hours to practice it. He played in school bands and eventually learned music theory as well as other percussive instruments.

In 1984, Foster auditioned for a band called White Heat, in which Bill Leverty was the guitarist. He got the job, and eventually they met C.J. Snare and Perry Richardson through touring in the Carolinas. The four joined forces as White Heat in 1988 and changed their name to Firehouse prior to their first release with Epic Records in 1990. Firehouse went on to sell over 7 million albums worldwide and have a number of international hits.

Foster filled in for Warrant drummer, Steven Sweet, from December 2012 until February 2013, while Sweet recovered from a neck injury.

Personal life
Foster married Lori Mingee on September 15, 1995. They have two daughters and one son together.

References

External links
Michael Foster's Homepage

1964 births
Living people
American rock drummers
FireHouse (band) members
20th-century American drummers
American male drummers
Musicians from Virginia